Nicolò Cudrig (born 7 August 2002) is an Italian professional footballer who plays as forward for  club Juventus Next Gen.

Career

Early career 
Cudrig started to playing youth football for Udinese. On 31 July 2018, Cudrig moved to Monaco. The following day, Cudrig was loaned to Cercle Brugge for one year.

Juventus U23 
On 29 July 2021, Cudrig moved to Juventus U23 — the reserve team of Juventus. He made his debut on 22 August 2021, in a 3–2 win against Pro Sesto, scoring the 2–2 goal in the 41st minute. On 24 October, Cudrig failed a penalty in a 1–1 draw against Pro Sesto in the 24th minute. On 20 February 2022, Cudrig scored his first Serie C goal in match drawn 2–2 against Seregno. In the new season, on 9 September, he scored a 94th-minute equaliser through an header from a corner kick.

International career 
Cudrig represented Italy internationally at under-15, under-16, under-17, under-18 and under-20 levels.

Career statistics

Club

External links

References

Notelist 

2002 births
Living people
Sportspeople from Udine
Footballers from Friuli Venezia Giulia
Italian footballers
Association football forwards
Italy youth international footballers
Udinese Calcio players
AS Monaco FC players
Cercle Brugge K.S.V. players
Juventus Next Gen players
Serie C players
Italian expatriate footballers
Italian expatriate sportspeople in Monaco
Italian expatriate sportspeople in Belgium
Expatriate footballers in Monaco
Expatriate footballers in Belgium